Scic was an Italian professional cycling team that existed from 1969 to 1979.

References

Further reading

External links

Defunct cycling teams based in Italy
1969 establishments in Italy
1979 disestablishments in Italy
Cycling teams established in 1969
Cycling teams disestablished in 1979